Elcat or ELCat may refer to:

 Elcat Electric Vehicles
 Catalogue of Endangered Languages (ELCat)